Serapias cordigera is a species of orchids found from the Azores, south-central Europe to the Mediterranean.

References

External links 

cordigera
Orchids of Europe
Flora of the Azores
Flora of Malta